The Butcher Boy may refer to:
The Butcher Boy (novel), 1992 novel by Patrick McCabe
The Butcher Boy (1997 film), film adaptation of the 1992 novel
The Butcher Boy (1917 film), debut film of Buster Keaton
The Butcher Boy (1932 film), second of the thirteen Pooch the Pup cartoons
The Butcher Boy (soundtrack), composed by Elliot Goldenthal
Butcher Boy (band), an indie pop band from Glasgow, Scotland 
"The Butcher Boy", a song by Lambchop from the album Nixon
The Butcher Boy (folk song), an American folk song derived from English balladry
A character in the novel The BFG
The Butcher Boy (cartoon), a 1932 Walter Lantz cartoon
The "butcher boy" play in baseball where a batter pulls back a bunt and swings away.
 "The Butcher Boys", a sculpture by artist South African Jane Alexander